Esperanza Mbang Mba (born 22 October 1989) is an Equatorial Guinean footballer who plays as a centre-back for Spanish club Valdemoro CF. She has been a member of the Equatorial Guinea women's national team.

Club career
Mbang started with Estrellas de E'Waiso Ipola in the Equatoguinean women's football league. She moved to Leones Vegetarianos FC in 2018. She joined Spanish team El Ejido in the winter of 2019.

International career
Mbang made her international debut for Equatorial Guinea on 26 November 2017, starting in a 4–0 home friendly win against Comoros. She also played two 2018 Africa Women Cup of Nations qualification matches against Kenya and the three matches of the team at the final tournament.

References

1989 births
Living people
People from Bata, Equatorial Guinea
Equatoguinean women's footballers
Women's association football central defenders
CD El Ejido (women) players
Equatorial Guinea women's international footballers
Equatoguinean expatriate women's footballers
Equatoguinean expatriate sportspeople in Spain
Expatriate women's footballers in Spain